Networked-loan, also known as networked-guarantee loan, is a popular economic phenomenon in some Asia countries. In these countries, if the borrowers do not meet the loan criteria of commercial banks, they are allowed to find guarantors to back their applicants. If the borrowers default on their loans, their guarantors take the legal obligation to repay the loan, which is called guaranteed-loan, or networked-guarantee loan.

In practice, there can be more than one guarantor per loan transaction, and there may be multiple loan transactions for a single guarantor in a given period. Once the loan is approved, the company can usually immediately obtain the full amount of the loan and begin to repay the bank via a regular installment plan, until the end of the agreement.

During the credit expansion period, with more and more enterprises involved, they form complex directed networks, which is called guarantee network, or loan network. However, every coin has two sides. On one hand, these secured loans can help an enterprise to source financing rapidly and promote development during a period of economic growth. On the other hand, it may result in a chain risk and even a systematic crisis. Usually, the guaranteed loan has a debt obligation contract. This means if one corporation fails to repay the bank, the guarantor has to pay for it, and this leads to risk spreading across the guarantee network, which may lead to default contagions. To monitor potential risks and prevent large-scale default, the problem of monitoring and rating contagion risk is receiving increasing attention.

Background 
The origin of networked-guarantee loans is as follows. Usually, it's difficult for small and medium businesses to meet the requirements of commercial banks, which are originally designed for large-scale industries. Most of these enterprises in the stage of rapid expansion are difficult to obtain loan funds from the banks. However, they are allowed to seek a guarantee from other businesses in some Asian countries. When more and more enterprises are involved, they form networks with complex structures. In practice, there can be more than one guarantor per loan transaction, and there may be multiple loan transactions for a single guarantor in a given period. Once the loan is approved, the company can usually immediately obtain the full amount of the loan and begin to repay the bank via a regular installment plan, until the end of the agreement.

Procedure  
The figure shows a typical procedure for network-guaranteed loans. It includes five modules. First of all, the borrower finds several guarantors to provide credit guarantees and signs the contracts with the banks. Then the banks perform a pre-loan risk assessment, and if passed the borrower receives the funds and repays the interests and principal (or partial) regularly according to the loan contract. The bank monitors the repayment status and conducts a post-loan risk assessment. Suppose the borrower fails to repay the rest part of the loan, its guarantors have to pay as the contract address.

Default Contagion in Networked-loans
Default contagion is usually triggered by accidental defaults that introduce risks in Networked-loans. Because these are obligatory contracts, default contagion can spread to those who provide the guarantees. Predicting how a debt default might spread is critical to introducing appropriate response interventions. Appropriate guarantee alliances can reduce the risk of default, but significant losses from default contagion can still occur between network companies. In an economic downturn, default events can multiply as large-scale corporate defaults cause side effects in the network. 
In such cases, the sponsoring network can be estranged from “joint assistance group” as a “breach of contract”. A crisis can trigger a domino effect when some firms face operational difficulties. Defaults can spread rapidly through the network, disadvantaging a large number of firms. It may lead to a systemic crisis. 
At this stage, control and mitigation are imperative. Contrary to popular belief, financial crisis enhances the resilience of mutual network while government bailouts degenerates network resilience. After the elimination or eradication phase, the collateral network may need to be broken up into several smaller networks, with some firms going bankrupt, to reduce the transmission risk. However, when the government intervenes during these phases, many bankruptcies would be prevented, thus compromising the resilience of the network.

Risk Rating in Networked-loans

The guaranteed loan has a debt obligation contract. This means if one corporation fails to repay the bank, the guarantor has to pay for it, and this leads to risk spreading across the guarantee network.

To address these problems, some deep learning-based methods are proposed Usually, the accidental default is tolerable while the large-scale defaults or systemic financial crisis is to be firmly prevented.

The banking industry has developed credit risk models for each loan applicant since the middle of the twentieth century. The risk rating is also the main business of thousands of worldwide corporations, including dozens of public companies. They have kept these models state-of-the-art by investing millions of dollars. However, global loan default losses still amounted to over 50 billion US dollars in 2018 and are forecasted to continue to increase. This massive amount of losses has increased the importance of risk curbing. Traditionally, the credit scoring models are built using regression algorithms with the temporal credit or loan history as well as some aggregated financial information of the applicants. Shallow learning methods, including the classic logistic regression, neural network, etc., are extensively utilized to obtain the credit score of the applicants.

Deep learning methods are recently used to address this problem. TRACER is a novel approach to rate the risk of contagion chains in the bank industry with the deep neural network. They employed the temporal inter-chain attention network on graph-structured loan behavior data to compute risk scores for the contagion chains, which is significantly better than the state-of-the-art baselines on the dataset from a major financial institution in Asia.

Some visualization tools are also proposed to apply visual analytics for networked-guarantee loans risk management.

Top-K Vulnerable Firms in Networked-loans 
To identify and ultimately prevent systematic crises in guaranteed loan networks, an important approach is to identify the top-k vulnerable nodes(firms) and place them under close supervision. A study in 2022 modeled the problem with an uncertain graph, and infer the default probability of a node following the possible world semantics, which has been widely used to capture the contagious phenomenon in real networks. In particular, it utilize an uncertain graph with two types of probabilities to model the occurrence and prorogation of the default risks in the network, namely the self-risk probability and the diffusion probability. To accelerate the process of searching for the vulnerable nodes, it employed combinations of  basic sampling approach, optimized sampling approach and bottom-k based approach. They received the best result in  efficiency with the bottom-k based method by integrating reverse while mostly maintaining the precision (Compared with the naïve approach). The proposed approach outperforms baseline methods such as GBDT and HGAR as measured by AUC.

References 

Finance in Asia